Betty A. Nuovo (born December 10, 1931 in Englewood, New Jersey) is an American attorney and Democratic politician. She was a member of the Vermont House of Representatives from the Addison-1 District from 1996 to 2017.

References

1931 births
Living people
Democratic Party members of the Vermont House of Representatives
People from Englewood, New Jersey
Vermont lawyers
20th-century American politicians
21st-century American politicians
Women state legislators in Vermont
21st-century American women politicians
20th-century American women politicians